Diceratura is a genus of moths belonging to the family Tortricidae.

Species
Diceratura amaranthica Razowski, 1963
Diceratura complicana Aarvik, 2010
Diceratura diceratops Razowski, 1967
Diceratura infantana (Kennel, 1899)
Diceratura ostrinana (Guenee, 1845)
Diceratura porrectana Djakonov, 1929
Diceratura rhodograpta Djakonov, 1929
Diceratura roseofasciana (Mann, 1855)
Diceratura teheranica Razowski, 1970

See also
List of Tortricidae genera

References

 , 2010: Review of East African Cochylini (Lepidoptera, Tortricidae) with description of new species. Norwegian Journal of Entomology 57 (2): 81-108. Abstract: .
 , 2005: World catalogue of insects volume 5 Tortricidae.
 , 1929, Rev. Russe Ent. 23: 155
 , 2011: Diagnoses and remarks on genera of Tortricidae, 2: Cochylini (Lepidoptera: Tortricidae). Shilap Revista de Lepidopterologia 39 (156): 397–414.

External links
tortricidae.com

Cochylini
Tortricidae genera